Pine Island is a small, privately owned island in the city of New Rochelle in Westchester County, New York. The island is situated off the coast of Davenport Neck near Sans Souci Beach in Long Island Sound.

External link

Geography of New Rochelle, New York
Long Island Sound
Private islands of New York (state)